Clematis macropetala is a species of flowering plant in the family Ranunculaceae native to northwestern China, Mongolia, and adjoining areas of Siberia. Its cultivars 'Ballet Skirt', 'Lagoon', 'Pauline', and 'Wesselton' have gained the Royal Horticultural Society's Award of Garden Merit.

References

macropetala
Flora of Chita Oblast
Flora of Amur Oblast
Flora of Mongolia
Flora of Inner Mongolia
Flora of Manchuria
Flora of Qinghai
Flora of North-Central China
Plants described in 1829